Unified Canadian Aboriginal Syllabics Extended-A is a Unicode block containing extensions to the Canadian syllabics contained in the Unified Canadian Aboriginal Syllabics Unicode block.  The extension adds missing characters for Nattilik and historical characters for Cree and Ojibwe.

History
The following Unicode-related documents record the purpose and process of defining specific characters in the Unified Canadian Aboriginal Syllabics Extended block:

References

Unicode blocks
Canadian Aboriginal syllabics